Mary Ann Eckles (born July 22, 1947) was  an American politician.

Eckles lived in Murfreesboro, Tennessee with her husband and family. She served in the Tennessee House of Representatives from 1995 to 2001 and was a Democrat.

References

1947 births
Living people
People from Murfreesboro, Tennessee
Women state legislators in Tennessee
Democratic Party members of the Tennessee House of Representatives
20th-century American women politicians